Chthamalus fissus is a species of star barnacle in the family Chthamalidae.

References

External links

 

Sessilia

Crustaceans described in 1854